The International Society of Cryptozoology (ISC) was an organization dedicated to the field of cryptozoology founded in 1982 in Washington, D.C. It ceased to exist in 1998.

It was founded to serve as a center for documenting and evaluating topics of interest to cryptozoologists. The study of such animals is known as cryptozoology, and Cryptozoology was also the title of its journal. The President was Bernard Heuvelmans, and the Vice-President Roy Mackal.  The Secretary was J. Richard Greenwell (died 2005), of the University of Arizona. Loren Coleman, John Willison Green, and several other prominent cryptozoologists were either Life Members, Honorary Members, or Board Members.

The official emblem of the society was the okapi, which was chosen because, although it was well known to the inhabitants of its region, it was unknown to the  European scientific community until the English explorer Harry Johnston sent to London an okapi skin which received international attention in 1901.

The journal Cryptozoology was published from 1982 to 1996. The Society also published a newsletter ISC News.

The ISC ended its activities in 1998 due to financial problems, though a website continued until 2005.

According to the journal Cryptozoology, the ISC served "as a focal point for the investigation, analysis, publication, and discussion of all matters related to animals of unexpected form or size, or unexpected occurrence in time or space."

Notes and references

Cryptozoology
Organizations based in Washington, D.C.
Organizations established in 1982
1982 establishments in Washington, D.C.
International organisations based in London